The Kapalua International was an unofficial PGA Tour event from 1982 to 1997. It was played after the end of the regular PGA Tour season. It was played at the Kapalua Golf Club in Kapalua, Hawaii. The Mercedes Championships moved to the site in January 1999.

Winners

References

PGA Tour unofficial money events
Golf in Hawaii
Sports in Maui
Recurring sporting events established in 1982
Recurring sporting events disestablished in 1997
1982 establishments in Hawaii
1997 disestablishments in Hawaii